Olive Chapel African Methodist Episcopal Church (also known as Olive Chapel AME Church, and Evangelische Friedens Gemneinde Lutheran Congregation) is a historic church built in 1899, and located at 309 S. Harrison Avenue in Kirkwood, Missouri. It is the oldest Protestant church in Kirkwood. It was added to the National Register of Historic Places on April 20, 2004.

History 
The congregation was founded in 1853 by the Reverend Jordan Winston Early. Services were initially held in a private home.

The current church building, constructed in 1899, originally housed the Friedens Evangelical Lutheran Church/Peace Lutheran Church. The Olive Chapel AME congregation bought it in 1923. The church still has its original bell, pews, and stained glass windows.

The Quinette Cemetery was associated with this church from 1866 until 2002.

See also 
 African Methodist Episcopal Church

References

African Methodist Episcopal churches in Missouri
Lutheran churches in Missouri
Gothic Revival church buildings in Missouri
Churches completed in 1896
Religious buildings and structures in St. Louis County, Missouri
Churches on the National Register of Historic Places in Missouri
National Register of Historic Places in St. Louis County, Missouri